Bogey may refer to:

People
Nickname
 Humphrey Bogart (1899–1957), American actor
 Xander Bogaerts (born 1992), Aruban professional baseball player
 Wilton Gaynair (1927–1995), Jamaican jazz musician
 Lionel Protip Sen (1910–1981), Indian Army lieutenant-general
Surname
 Robert Bogey (born 1935), French former long-distance runner

Arts and entertainment
 Bogey Awards, German film awards
 Bogey (comics), a character in Spanish comics 
 Bogey Orangutan, a character in the Shirt Tales cartoons
 Bogey, a villain in the English-language French animated series A.T.O.M

Sports 
 Bogey (golf), a score of one over par on a hole in the sport of golf
 Bogey, another name for a gravity racer

Other uses
 "Bogey", a multiservice tactical brevity code for an unidentified radar or visual air contact
 "Bogey", an RAF Second World War code name for an unidentified aircraft
 Bogey, an Australian Aboriginal word for bath
 Bogey, slang for dried nasal mucus
 Bogey Hole, an ocean pool in Newcastle, Australia
 Bogey or Bogeyman, a mythical monster
 Another word for devil

See also
 Bogie (disambiguation)
 Bogy (disambiguation)
 Boogie (disambiguation)

Lists of people by nickname